Vatra Dornei is a town in Suceava County, north-eastern Romania. It is situated in the historical region of Bukovina. Vatra Dornei is the fifth largest urban settlement in the county, with a population of 14,429 inhabitants, according to the 2011 census. 

It was declared a municipality in 2000, being the newest and smallest municipality in the county. The city administers three villages: Argestru, Roșu, and Todireni. Vatra Dornei is a well known spa and ski resort in the Carpathian Mountains and also is home to the historic Vatra Dornei Casino.

Administration and local politics

Town council 

The town's current local council has the following political composition, according to the results of the 2020 Romanian local elections:

Geography

Vatra Dornei is at the confluence of the rivers Bistrița and Dorna, in the Dorna Depression. Because of its mountain surroundings, the city is a spa and ski resort, one of the oldest resorts in Romania. Vatra Dornei is connected to the Romanian national railway system and has two railway stations, Vatra Dornei and Vatra Dornei Băi, both historical monuments. The European route E58, that links the region of Moldavia with Transylvania, crosses the city.

History
The earliest written mention of the settlement is from 1592. Together with the rest of Bukovina, Vatra Dornei was under the rule of the Habsburg monarchy (later Austria-Hungary) from 1775 to 1918. This was a period of development for the town, which became a well known resort in the early 19th century. Between 1925 and 1950, Vatra Dornei was part of the former Câmpulung County. From 1950 to present it's part of Suceava County.

The historic Vatra Dornei Casino is located in the municipality.

Demographics 

Until the early 1950s, Vatra Dornei had an ethnically mixed population of Romanians, Germans (more specifically Bukovina Germans), Ukrainians, and Jews. The large synagogue and a picturesque Jewish cemetery bear witness to the Jewish presence and historical legacy in the area.

Vatra Dornei reached its peak population in 1992, when about 18,500 people were living within the town limits. Then the city population declined gradually. According to the 2011 census, Vatra Dornei had a total population of 13,659 inhabitants. Of this population, 98.65% are ethnically Romanians, 0.64% Roma, 0.23% Germans (Bukovina Germans), 0.22% Hungarians, and 0.10% Ukrainians.

Vatra Dornei is the fifth most populated urban settlement in Suceava County, after the county capital, Suceava, and the cities of Rădăuți, Fălticeni, and Câmpulung Moldovenesc. Vatra Dornei is also the smallest and newest municipality in Suceava County.

Tourism
Vatra Dornei is a well known ski resort in the Carpathian Mountains. There are ski slopes nearby the city, attracting tourists in winter season. Vatra Dornei is surrounded by large forest areas, proper places for practicing alpine tourism. There are mineral water springs in the city limits and its surroundings, that helped the settlement to develop as a spa. In the late 19th century and early 20th century Bukovina had only two spa towns: Vatra Dornei and Solca.

Vatra Dornei has several hotels, two museums (The Ethnographic Museum and The Museum of Natural Sciences) and a few old buildings that are considered historical and architectural monuments: the casino, the main spa building, the two railway stations, the town hall, Sentinela Spring, the post office building, and a few old churches.

Natives
 Vasile Deac (1824–1909), Mayor of Vatra Dornei
 Liliana Ichim (born 1967), alpine skier
 Alfred Kuzmany (1893–1961), army general in the Wehrmacht in World War II
 Bogdan Macovei (born 1983), luger 
 Andrei Nilă (born 1985), footballer
 Platon Pardău (1934–2002), poet and writer
 Teodosie Petrescu (born 1955), cleric

Gallery

References

External links

  Vatra Dornei Town Hall official site
  Vatra Dornei unofficial site
  Vatra Dornei touristic site
  The City Hospital of Vatra Dornei
  Vatra Dornei Live - Local news site
  Suceava County site - Vatra Dornei web page
  Photo Gallery - Old photos of Vatra Dornei

Cities in Romania
Populated places in Suceava County
Ski areas and resorts in Romania
Spa towns in Romania
Mining communities in Romania
Bukovina-German people
Jewish communities in Romania
Localities in Southern Bukovina
Monotowns in Romania